Masonic chess is a chess variant invented by George R. Dekle Sr. in 1983. The game is played on a modified chessboard whereby even-numbered  are indented to the right—resembling masonry brickwork. The moves of the pieces are adapted to the new geometry; in other respects the game is the same as chess.

Masonic chess was included in World Game Review No. 10 edited by Michael Keller.

Board characteristics
The Masonic board cells are slightly rectangular, and indentation of alternating ranks results in cants (oblique files) 30° from the vertical and diagonals 30° from the horizontal, the same as hexagon-based chessboards when cell vertices face the players. (For example, rooks have six directions of movement, and Masonic pawns move and capture the same as pawns in De Vasa's hexagonal chess. Masonic bishops, however, are limited to the four diagonal directions to the sides.) As with hex-based boards, three colors are used, so no two adjacent cells are the same color, and gameboard diagonals are highlighted.

Game rules
The diagram shows the starting setup.

Piece moves
 A rook moves along the rank (two directions) and cants (four directions).
 A bishop moves on diagonals to the sides (four directions), or one step as a rook (six directions).
 The queen moves as a rook and bishop. (Ten directions.)
 The king moves one step as a queen.      
 A knight moves in the pattern: one step as a rook, then one step diagonally in the same (forward, backward, or sideways) direction. A knight leaps any intervening men.
 A pawn moves one step forward as a rook; on its first move it may optionally move two steps forward in the same direction. A pawn captures one step diagonally forward; en passant captures are permitted.

See also
 De Vasa's hexagonal chess
 Also by George Dekle:
 Masonic Shogi
 Cross chess – a hexagonal variant with cross-shaped cells

References

Bibliography

Chess variants
1983 in chess
Board games introduced in 1983